The 1961 Ohio Bobcats football team was an American football team that represented Ohio University in the Mid-American Conference (MAC) during the 1961 NCAA University Division football season. In their fourth season under head coach Bill Hess, the Bobcats compiled a 5–3–1 record (3–2–1 against MAC opponents), finished in fourth place in the MAC, and outscored all opponents by a combined total of 129 to 116.  They played their home games in Peden Stadium in Athens, Ohio.

The team's statistical leaders included Otis Wagner with 441 rushing yards, Bob Babbitt with 573 passing yards, and John Trevis with 258 receiving yards.

Schedule

References

Ohio
Ohio Bobcats football seasons
Ohio Bobcats football